The History of Karnataka goes back several millennia. Several great empires and dynasties have ruled over Karnataka and have contributed greatly to the history, culture and development of Karnataka as well as the entire Indian subcontinent. The Chindaka Nagas of central India Gangas,   Rashtrakutas of Manyakheta, Chalukyas of Vengi, Yadava Dynasty of Devagiri were all of Kannada origin who later took to encouraging local languages.

In the medieval and early modern periods, the Vijayanagara Empire and the Bahmani Sultanate became the major powers in Karnataka. The latter disintegrated to form five Deccan Sultanates. The Deccan Sultanates defeated the Vijayanagara Empire in 1565.

In the 17th and 18th centuries, the Maratha Empire ruled most of present-day Karnataka. Maratha rule was most fortified in the northern regions of present-day Karnataka. The first Maratha expeditions in the region were led by Chhatrapati Shivaji. As Maratha power weakened in the 1780s, the Kingdom of Mysore began occupying lands in Southern Karnataka.

After the Anglo-Mysore Wars, where the East India Company defeated the forces of Tipu Sultan, Company Rule began in India. Karnataka was divided between the Bombay Presidency, the Kingdom of Mysore and the Nizam of Hyderabad.

India  became Independent in 1947, and according to the States Reorganization Act, 1956, the Kannada-speaking areas of Hyderabad State, Madras State were unified with Mysore State. The state was renamed as Karnataka in 1973.

Prehistory

The credit for doing early extensive study of prehistoric Karnataka goes to Robert Bruce-Foote and this work was later continued by many other scholars. The pre-historic culture of Karnataka (and South India in general) is called the hand-axe culture, as opposed to the Sohan culture of North India. Paleolithic hand axes and cleavers in the shape of pebbles made with quartz and quartzite which have been found in places such as Lingadahalli in Chikkamagaluru district and Hunasagi in Yadgir district, and a wooden spike at Kibbanahalli in Tumkur district are examples of old Stone Age implements. There are reports that a polished stone axe was discovered at Lingasugur in the Raichur district Neolithic sites (new Stone Age) of importance are Maski in Raichur district, Brahmagiri in Chitradurga district etc., with abundance of evidence that man begun to domesticate animals such as cows, dogs and sheep, use copper and bronze weapons, wear bangles, rings, necklaces of beads and ear-rings and have burial chambers. To the end of the Neolithic era, during the Megalithic age, people in Karnataka began to use long swords, sickles, axes, hammers, spikes, chisels and arrows, all made of iron.

Influences from the Indus Valley Civilization 
Scholarly hypothesis postulates contacts between the Indus Valley cities of Harappa and Lothal, citing the discovery of gold found in the Harappan sites that was imported from mines in Karnataka.

Evidence of Neolithic habitation of areas in modern Karnataka and celts dating back to the 2nd century BCE were first discovered in 1872. There are reports that a polished stone axe was discovered at Lingsugur in the Raichur district; however the authenticity of these reports remains unverifiable. Megalithic structures and burial grounds were discovered in 1862 in the regions of Kodagu and Moorey Betta hills, while Neolithic sites were discovered in north Karnataka. Scholarly hypothesis postulates of contacts between the Indus Valley city of Harappa in 3000 BCE, citing the discovery of gold found in the Harappan sites that was imported from mines in Karnataka.

Classical period

Karnataka was the part of the Maurya Empire, the first Mauryan Emperor Chandragupta Maurya died in Shravanbelgola in Hassan District around 298 BCE where he spent last days of his life as Jain ascetic.

Around 239 BCE, the Satavahana dynasty came to power and its rule lasted nearly four centuries, until the early 3rd century CE. The disintegration of the Satavahana dynasty led to the ascent of the earliest native kingdoms, the Kadamba Dynasty of Banavasi in modern Uttara Kannada district with Mayuravarma, a native of Talagunda in modern Shivamogga district as the founding king, and the Western Ganga Dynasty in southern Karnataka, marking the birth of the region as an independent political entity. These were the first kingdoms to give administrative status to Kannada language as evidenced by the Halmidi inscription of 450, attributed to King Kakusthavarma of the Kadamba Dynasty. Also, recent discovery of a 5th-century copper coin in Banavasi, ancient capital of the Kadambas, with Kannada script inscription on it, further proves the usage of Kannada at an official level.

Middle Kingdoms (230 BCE – 1206 CE) 

They were followed by large imperial empires, the Badami Chalukyas, Rashtrakuta Dynasty and Western Chalukya Empire, who had their regal capitals in modern Karnataka region and patronized Kannada language and literature.

Badami Chalukyas 

The Badami Chalukyas ruled between the 6th and the 8th centuries.

Rashtrakutas 

The Rashtrakutas were originally vassals of the Badami Chalukyas. Dantidurga overthrew the Chalukya ruler Kirtivarman II in 735 CE, and established the rule of the Rashtrakuta dynasty.

During this period, important contributions were made in the field of literature, arts, and mathematics. Amoghavarsha I, the most famous king of this dynasty wrote Kavirajamarga, a landmark literary work in the Kannada language. Important mathematical theories and axioms were postulated by Mahaviracharya.

Western Chalukyas 

The Western Chalukyas ruled Karnataka between 973 and 1189 CE.

Western Gangas 

The Western Ganga dynasty was founded around 350 CE, ruling southern Karnataka. Their sovereignty lasted from about 350 to 550 CE, after which they ruled as vassals of the Badami Chalukyas, Rashtrakutas, and Western Chalukyas. Their rule came to an end after the disintegration of the Western Chalukyas in 1000 CE.

Though a small kingdom, the Western Ganga contribution to polity, culture and literature of the modern south Karnataka region is considered important. The Western Ganga kings showed benevolent tolerance to all faiths but are most famous for their patronage toward Jainism resulting in the construction of monuments in places such as Shravanabelagola and Kambadahalli. The kings of this dynasty encouraged the fine arts due to which literature in Kannada and Sanskrit flourished.

Hoysala Empire 

Natives of the malnad Karnataka, the Hoysalas established the Hoysala Empire at the turn of the first millennium. Art and architecture flourished in the region during this time resulting in distinctive Kannada literary metres and the construction of temples and sculptures adhering to the Vesara style of architecture.  The expansion of the Hoysala Empire brought large parts of modern Andhra Pradesh and Tamil Nadu under their rule.

Other Kingdoms 
The Seuna dynasty, Kadamba dynasty, and Chola Empire ruled parts of Karnataka.

Vijayanagara Era (1336–1565)

In the early 14th century, the Vijayanagara Empire with its capital at Hosapattana (later to be called Vijayanagara) rose to successfully challenge the Muslim invasions into the South. This empire was established by Harihara I and Bukka Raya who many historians claim were commanders of the last Hoysala King Veera Ballala III and the empire prospered for over two centuries.

The Vijayanagara rulers patronized culture, and a distinct form of literature and architecture evolved during this period. The best example of Vijayanagara architecture is seen in the ruined city of Hampi.

Battle of Talikota 

The main rivals of the Vijayanagara empire were the five Deccan Sultanates, who defeated the empire in 1565 at the Battle of Talikota.

Two generals of the Vijayanagara army switched sides and turned their loyalty to the united Sultanates. They captured Aliya Rama Raya and beheaded him on the spot. The beheading of Rama Raya created confusion and havoc and in the still loyal portions of the Vijayanagara army, which were then completely routed. The Sultanates' army plundered Hampi and reduced it into ruins.

Bahmani and Deccan Sultanates 

The Bahmani sultans of Bidar were the main competitors to the Vijayanagara empire for hegemony over the Deccan and after their fall, the Bijapur Sultanate and Bidar Sultanate took their place in the dynastic struggle for control of the southern India. 

After the defeat and disintegration of the Vijayanagara Empire in battle at Talikota in 1565 to a confederacy of Sultanates, the Bijapur Sultanate rose as the main power in the Deccan before their defeat to the Mughal Empire in late 17th century. Mughal Emperor Aurangzeb gave the order to besiege Bijapur and after a 15-month-long siege, the Mughal army emerged victorious and the Adil Shahi dynasty came to an end.

The Bahmani and Bijapur rulers encouraged Urdu and Persian literature and Indo Islamic architecture, the Gol Gumbaz being one of the high points of this contribution. Bidriware and Deccan painting developed during this period. The Madrasa Mahmud Gawan was a university built during the reign of the Bahmani Sultanate, one of the few centers of higher learning in medieval India.

Maratha Era 
Most of Karnataka was conquered by the Maratha Empire in the 17th and 18th centuries. The first expeditions were led by Chhatrapati Shivaji. After Shivaji's death in 1680, his son Chhatrapati Sambhaji inherited the throne of the Marathas. He ruled until his capture, torture, and execution by the Mughal emperor Aurangzeb in 1689. From this time until 1707, the war of 27 years was fought in the Deccan, including Karnataka. The Mughals raided the region several times but struggled in conquering the territory. The Maratha Empire continued to rule over the majority of Karnataka until the rise of Mysore in the late 18th century.

The Rise of Mysore 

The Wodeyars of Mysore, former vassals of the Vijayanagara Empire, After the fall of vijayanagara empire Mysore became independent kingdom 17th-18th century. With the death of Krishnaraja Wodeyar II, Haider Ali, the Commander-in-Chief of the Mysore Army, assumed control over the region, until the rule of the kingdom was passed to Tipu Sultan, after Haider Ali's death. In attempting to contain European expansion in South India, Tipu Sultan, known as the Tiger of Mysore fought four significant Anglo-Mysore Wars, the last of which resulted in his death and the incorporation of Mysore into a princely state of the British Raj.

Following Tipu's fall, a part of the kingdom of Mysore was annexed and divided between the Madras Presidency and the Nizam. The remaining territory was transformed into a princely state; the five-year-old scion of the Wodeyar family, Krishnaraja III, was installed on the throne with chief minister (Diwan) Purnaiah.

The Mysore State and Hyderabad State, which ruled most of Karnataka, were allied with the British during the Indian Rebellion of 1857.

The Princely State of Mysore and British influences (1799–1947)

The Princely State of Mysore 

During this time, railways and airways, as well as modern universities were introduced in the Kingdom of Mysore, which was ruled by the Wadiyar dynasty. The Kingdom of Mysore became a princely state by this time. The Indian Institute of Science (1909) and University of Mysore (1916) were the first educational institutions established in Karnataka.

Independence movement 
The British period was a time of racial discrimination, economic exploitation, and numerous preventable famines, most notably in the areas directly administered by the British, which was known then as British India.

By the late 19th century, the independence movement had gained momentum; Aluru Venkata Raya, S. Nijalingappa, Kengal Hanumanthaiah, Nittoor Srinivasa Rau and others carried on the struggle into the early 20th century.

Post-independence (1947–present)

Unification of Karnataka 

After Indian independence, the Wodeyar Maharaja acceded to India. In 1950, Mysore became an Indian state, and the former Maharaja became its rajpramukh, or governor, until 1975. The Ekikarana movement which started in the later half of the 20th century, culminated in the States Reorganisation Act of 1956 which provided for parts of Coorg, Madras, Hyderabad, and Bombay states to be incorporated into the state of Mysore. Mysore state was renamed Karnataka in 1973.  The state of Mysore was formed on 1 November 1956 and since then 1 November of every year is celebrated as Kannada Rajyotsava / Karnataka Rajyotsava.

Post-unification 
The 1957 elections saw the Indian National Congress win 150 seats out of 208, and S. Nijalingappa was retained as Chief Minister. 

The Congress retained its power in Karnataka till 1983, when the Janata Party formed the first non-Congress government in Karnataka with the support of other smaller parties. Subsequent elections have seen power switch between the Congress, Bharatiya Janata Party, and other parties.

Timeline

References

Notes

Citations

Bibliography

 Dr. Suryanath U. Kamat, Concise history of Karnataka, 2001, MCC, Bangalore (Reprinted 2002) 
 S. Srikanta Sastri, "Sources of Karnataka History, Vol I (1940) " - University of Mysore Historical Series, University of Mysore, Mysore.
 Nilakanta Sastri, K.A. (1955). A History of South India, From Prehistoric times to fall of Vijayanagar, OUP, New Delhi (Reprinted 2002) ..
 Dr. Romila Thapar, The Penguin History of Early India From Origins to 1300 A.D., 2003, Penguin, New Delhi, .
 R. Narasimhacharya, History of Kannada Literature, 1988, Asian Educational Services, New Delhi, Madras,1988, .

 John Keay, History of India, 2000, Grove publications, New York, BINC: 6494766
 Karmarkar, A.P. (1947), Cultural history of Karnataka : ancient and medieval, Karnataka Vidyavardhaka Sangha, Dharwad

External links
 Rice, B L 1898. Epigraphica Carnatica Vol 2
 "Sources of Karnataka History, Vol I (1940)" by S. Srikanta Sastri